Andres Põder (born 22 November 1949) is an Estonian clergyman, bishop emeritus and the former archbishop of Tallinn and primate of the Evangelical Lutheran Church of Estonia (EELK) from 2005–2014. Põder is the current president of Estonian Council of Churches since 2013.

Biography
Põder was born on 22 November 1949 in Haapsalu. He was ordained priest on 19 September 1976 and served as pastor in Kunda, Viru-Nigula Parish. In 1979 he transferred to Kõpu and in 1983 congregations in Räpina and Mehikoorma. Between 1990 and 2005 he served as pastor of St. Elizabeth's Church, Pärnu.

He was elected on 24 November 2004 as Archbishop of Tallinn and Primate of the Estonian church. He was consecrated on 2 February 2005 by Jaan Kiivit Jr., the outgoing archbishop, in St Mary's Cathedral, Tallinn. He retired on 22 November 2014.

References

External links

1949 births
Living people
Estonian Lutheran bishops
Estonian Lutheran clergy
People from Haapsalu
Lutheran archbishops of Tallinn
21st-century Lutheran archbishops
Knights Commander of the Order of Merit of the Federal Republic of Germany
Recipients of the Order of the White Star, 2nd Class